Musaeus politus is a species of spiders in the family Thomisidae. It was first described in 1890 by Tamerlan Thorell. , it is the sole species in the genus Musaeus. It is from Sumatra.

References

Thomisidae
Spiders of Indonesia
Spiders described in 1890
Taxa named by Tamerlan Thorell